Sir Charles Jasper Selwyn PC (13 October 1813 – 11 August 1869) was an English lawyer, politician and Lord Justice of Appeal.

Background and education
Selwyn was born at Church Row, Hampstead, Middlesex, the third and youngest son of William Selwyn (1775–1855), and brother of George Augustus Selwyn, Bishop of Lichfield, and of William Selwyn (1806–1875), divine. He was educated at Ealing, Eton, and Trinity College, Cambridge, of which he was successively scholar and fellow. He graduated B.A. 1836, M.A. 1839, and LL.D. 1862.

Political and legal career
Selwyn was called to the Bar, Lincoln's Inn, on 27 January 1840, practised chiefly before the Master of the Rolls, and amassed a large fortune. He served as Commissary to the university of Cambridge from 1855 to 1868, became a Queen's Counsel on 7 April 1856, and in the same year was made a bencher of his inn. He entered parliament as member for Cambridge University in April 1859, and sat for that constituency until 1868. He was a staunch conservative and a churchman. He first spoke in the house on the address to the queen on arming the volunteer corps, and on 13 August 1859 made a speech on a question of privilege connected with the Pontefract election inquiry. In the same month he moved a resolution whereby the committee on the Stamp Duties Bill was enabled to introduce a clause extending probate duty to property exceeding one million in value, and a few months later secured the rejection of Lewis Llewelyn Dillwyn's Endowed Schools Bill.

Selwyn's speech on the motion for the second reading of the Ecclesiastical Commission Bill was considered his best. He spoke for a long time against the bill, and moved an amendment to it. The bill was subsequently withdrawn after a three nights' debate. On 20 February 1861 he divided the house successfully by an amendment to the Trustees of Charities Bill. One of his last speeches was on the Reform Bill of 1867, when he advocated that the lodger franchise should be extended to university lodgers in the town of Cambridge.

Selwyn became Solicitor-General in Lord Derby's last administration on 18 July 1867, and was knighted on 3 August. Benjamin Disraeli appointed him a Lord Justice of Appeal on 8 February 1868, and he was named a Privy Counsellor on 28 March.

Family
Selwyn married, first, in 1856, Hester, fifth daughter of John Goldsborough Ravenshaw, chairman of the East India Company, and widow of Thomas Dowler, M.D. He married, secondly, on 2 April 1869, Catherine Rosalie, daughter of Colonel Godfrey T. Greene, Royal Engineers, and widow of the Reverend Henry Dupuis, vicar of Richmond. He had a son, Charles William Selwyn (1858 - 1893) and two daughters, Edith Adriana Selwyn (1859-1910, married Edward Grant Fraser-Tytler) and Beatrice Eugénie Selwyn (1865-1898, married Patrick Herbert). His widow Catherine married Francis Hughes-Hallett in 1871.

Selwyn, in conjunction with L. F. Selwyn, wrote in 1847 Annals of the Diocese of New Zealand. He died at Pagoda House, Richmond, Surrey, on 11 August 1869, aged 55, and was buried in Nunhead Cemetery.

Arms

References

1813 births
1869 deaths
People from Hampstead
Members of the Privy Council of the United Kingdom
People educated at Eton College
Alumni of Trinity College, Cambridge
Members of Lincoln's Inn
19th-century English judges
Members of the Parliament of the United Kingdom for the University of Cambridge
UK MPs 1859–1865
UK MPs 1865–1868
Lords Justices of Appeal
Knights Bachelor
Conservative Party (UK) MPs for English constituencies
Members of the Judicial Committee of the Privy Council